Diego Fabián Barreto Lara (born 31 May 1993) is a Paraguayan professional footballer who plays as a forward for Liga Nacional club Comunicaciones.

Career statistics

Club

Notes

References

1993 births
Living people
Paraguayan footballers
Paraguayan expatriate footballers
Association football forwards
Grêmio Foot-Ball Porto Alegrense players
CR Flamengo footballers
Club Olimpia footballers
Deportivo Capiatá players
General Díaz footballers
Alianza Petrolera players
Atlético Huila footballers
River Plate (Asunción) footballers
Paraguayan Primera División players
Categoría Primera A players
Paraguayan expatriate sportspeople in Brazil
Expatriate footballers in Brazil
Paraguayan expatriate sportspeople in Colombia
Expatriate footballers in Colombia